Terre Bleue Creek is a stream in St. Francois and Ste. Genevieve counties of eastern Missouri. It is a tributary of the Big River.

Terre Bleue Creek was so named on account of the color of the dirt on its course, terre bleue being a name meaning "blue earth" in French.

Variant names
According to the Geographic Names Information System, it has also been known historically as: 
Terre Bleu Creek
Terre Blue Creek

See also
List of rivers of Missouri

References

Rivers of St. Francois County, Missouri
Rivers of Ste. Genevieve County, Missouri
Rivers of Missouri